Survay Says! was an American independent ska/pop punk band from Blairstown, New Jersey. Originally forming in 2008 by brothers Henry & Dennis Menzel, Survay Says! developed some following through their extensive tour schedule playing hundreds of shows (including 208 shows in 2013 alone).<ref>[https://www.facebook.com/survaysays/info Survay Says! Facebook pa'ge]</ref>

The band released four full-length studio albums and opened for bands like Big D and the Kids Table, Reel Big Fish, Less Than Jake, Red City Radio, and Patent Pending. They also played dates among the Vans Warped Tour, The Fest, as well as the Chicago date of Riot Fest 2014. After disbanding in 2016 the Menzel brothers went on to form Keep Flying.

Members

Final line-up
Henry Menzel – guitar, backing vocals (2008–2012), guitar, lead vocals  (2013–2016)
Dennis "D. Jay" Menzel – trombone, bass, guitar, backing vocals (2008–2012), trombone, guitar, lead vocals (2013–2016)
Michael Fenton – saxophone, backing vocals (2008–2016), bass (2008–2012)
Ricky Coates – trumpet, backing vocals (2013–2016)
Michael Coulson - bass (2015-2016)
Peter Vriones - drums (2011-2016)

Past members
Kevin Danilowski – lead vocals (2008–2012)
Charlie Yankowski – lead vocals, keyboards (2008–2010)
Eddie Lippincott - tenor saxophone (2008–2010)
Dan Schuster - trumpet (2008–2010)
Evan Hughes - trumpet (2008–2011)
Greg Lane – bass (2008–2012)
Colin Keebler – bass (2012–2013, 2014)
Ryan Fenton – drums (2008–2010)
Christopher Slater - drums (2010–2012)
Alex Vazquez - drums (2012–2013)
Don Muir - drums (2013)
Brent Lawrence Friedman - drums (2014–2016)

Touring members
Louis Pratt- bass (2011)
Peter Vriones - drums (2011-2016)
John Dzwonek - drums (2013)
 Scott Boyce - drums (2013)
Elio Vezza- bass (2014)
JT Turret- bass (2014)
Zack Genis- bass (2014)
Collin Fiol - bass (2015)
Matthew Koerner - bass (2015)
Jeff Cummings - trombone (2015)
Bobby Vaughn - bass (2015)

Timeline

Discography

Studio albumsIt's Self Titled! (2009)Well... Here It Is! (2010)Where We Exist (2012)Observations Of The Human Condition (2014)

EPsThe Good Answer EP (2010)Things I Need To Say'' (2013)

References

External links

Musical groups established in 2008
American ska punk musical groups
Pop punk groups from New Jersey